Igor Lovrić (born 7 October 1987) is a Croatian footballer playing as a goalkeeper, who played for NK Opatija.

Club career

Istra 1961
A product of the youth academy he made his debut for the team  in 1-0 loss against Inter Zapresic. He played 7 league matches for this club.

Karlovac
He joined Karlovac in a free transfer.
Lovric was made the 2nd choice goalkeeper at Karlovac. His debut for league was against Hajduk Split in a 6-1 defeat. He was substituted in the 46th minute for conceding 5 goals

Lokomotiva
On 25 January 2012, he joined Lokomotiva on a free transfer.

Club Statistics
As of 3 April 2013

References

External links

1987 births
Living people
Sportspeople from Pula
Association football goalkeepers
Croatian footballers
NK Istra 1961 players
NK Žminj players
NK Karlovac players
NK Lokomotiva Zagreb players
NK Hrvatski Dragovoljac players
NK Zagreb players
NK Opatija players
Croatian Football League players
First Football League (Croatia) players